Ratchet & Clank Future: Quest for Booty (known as Ratchet & Clank: Quest for Booty in Europe, Africa and Australia) is a 2008 platform game developed by Insomniac Games and published by Sony Computer Entertainment for the PlayStation 3. The game is the second installment in the Ratchet & Clank Future series. It was released on PlayStation Network in North America and Europe on August 21, 2008 and on Blu-ray Disc in Europe on September 12, 2008 and in Asia on September 25, 2008. The game continues from where Tools of Destruction left off, where Clank was taken by the Zoni, and follows Ratchet's quest to find him. Due to its length of approximately three to four hours of playtime, it was released at a lower price point than most standard retail games.

Gameplay 

Gameplay was first shown at E3 2008. This game features more puzzle solving and platforming than previous games in the series and introduces new features, such as the ability to pick things up with the Omniwrench Millennium 12. There are also sections where Ratchet must pick up creatures called Heliogrubs in order to light up a dark area. The Omniwrench Millennium 12 also has a tether ability, which can be used to manipulate objects and move obstacles. The Combuster, Fusion Grenade, Nano Swarmers, Predator Launcher, Tornado Launcher, Shock Ravager and Alpha Disrupter make their return from Tools of Destruction.

Plot 
A year after defeating Emperor Tachyon and witnessing the Zoni abduction of Clank at the end of Tools of Destruction, Ratchet and his partner Talwyn Apogee learn from the IRIS Supercomputer that Captain Angstrom Darkwater, a legendary space pirate, is the only individual with knowledge of how to contact the Zoni. Traveling to his home planet of Merdegraw in the Drogol Sector, the duo slip aboard a pirate fleet above the Azorean Sea, but are soon discovered and captured by Sprocket, Darkwater's first mate, who reveals that Darkwater has been dead for years. Seconds before the two are to be executed, Rusty Pete shows up disguised as Captain Romulus Slag (who Ratchet defeated in Tools of Destruction) and instead orders them to be marooned on Hoolefar Island.

After experiencing a brief vision of Clank surrounded by glowing energy, Ratchet reunites with Talwyn and meets the local leader, Mayor Barnabas Worley. He dispatches Ratchet to restore the island's power supply by restarting several wind turbines and then directs him to the town's radio operator, who asks Ratchet to purchase a Versabolt from the Smuggler so he can make badly needed repairs. As a reward for providing assistance, Worley reveals the existence of the Obsidian Eye, a powerful lorentzian telescope Darkwater built to maintain a link to the Zoni's home dimension. Unfortunately, the Eye's power source, an artifact known as the Fulcrum Star, was hidden by Darkwater shortly before he was killed in a mutiny organized by Slag.

Rusty Pete arrives and, with the help of Slag's still-functioning head, guides Ratchet and Talwyn to Darkwater's tomb in Morrow Caverns. After Talwyn is separated from the group by a cave-in, Ratchet and Pete travel on and reach Darkwater's ship. Pete then connects Slag's head to Darkwater's body, revealing that his only loyalty is to his former captain. Resurrected, Slag, sharing his new body with the vengeful spirit of Darkwater, takes control of Darkwater's ghost crew and fleet and sets out to pillage Hoolefar Island. After a pitched battle on the beach, the pirates are defeated and retreat.

With the Smuggler's help, Ratchet locates Darkwater Cove, where the Star is said to be hidden. After passing a series of tests set up by Darkwater, Ratchet accesses the treasure vault, only to fall into a cavern. The pirates arrive, confiscate the Star, and take Talwyn captive, leaving Sprocket to keep Ratchet from following them. Upon defeating him, Ratchet and the Smuggler pursue the enemy fleet.

Rescuing Talwyn, Ratchet confronts Slag and Darkwater, defeating them in a series of battles and eventually knocking them into the water. Pete goes to rescue them, allowing Ratchet to claim the star. Returning to the island, Ratchet activates the Obsidian Eye and learns that Clank has been damaged by overexposure to Zoni energy, losing his memories in the process. The Zoni reveal that they have found a doctor to fix him - specifically, Ratchet's old enemy Doctor Nefarious. Ratchet and Talwyn set off to save Clank, and the game ends with a stranded Pete and Slag adrift in the middle of the ocean.

Release 
Quest for Booty was announced as one of the free games given by Sony as part of their 'Welcome Back' package as a result of the PlayStation intrusion, which left users offline for over 3 weeks. (Europe and Australia only, replacing the game Super Stardust HD being offered in North America).

Sequel 
The credits teased the following entry in the series with the text "The Quest Continues in Fall 2009".

It was announced as A Crack in Time in March 2009. A Crack in Time was released for the PlayStation 3 in North America on October 27, 2009, in Europe on November 4, 2009, Australia on November 5, 2009 and in the United Kingdom on November 6, 2009.

Reception 

Quest for Booty received "generally positive reviews" from critics, according to review aggregator Metacritic.

1UP.com's Nick Suttner described the game as "a rollicking few hours, polished to a sheen and even better-paced than its full-length predecessors, although Booty tromps off with its own side story, ending on the same cliffhanger with little more resolved." Suttner also expressed that the game looks slightly better than Tools of Destruction due to improved lighting and better textures.

IGN reviewer Jeremy Dunham says "Quest for Booty has been designed as a quick four-hour experience and it feels shortchanged because of it. Though its shooting and platforming sequences are fun and of high production, it still seems like there's something missing," but said that "there are some really cool puzzles and new gameplay elements."

References

External links 

 
 

2008 video games
3D platform games
Insomniac Games games
PlayStation 3 games
PlayStation 3-only games
PlayStation Network games
Single-player video games
Sony Interactive Entertainment games
Ratchet & Clank
Space pirates
Video game sequels
Video games about pirates
Video games developed in the United States
Video games scored by David Bergeaud
Video games set on fictional islands